The name Claudette has been used for eight tropical cyclones in the Atlantic Ocean and for one in the South-West Indian Ocean.

In the Atlantic Ocean:
Tropical Storm Claudette (1979), traversed the Greater Antilles and made its final landfall near the made landfall near the Texas-Louisiana border.
Hurricane Claudette (1985), long-lived hurricane that wandered northeastward and grazed the Azores.
Hurricane Claudette (1991), Category 4 hurricane that remained at sea.
Tropical Storm Claudette (1997), passed southeast of the Outer Banks and moved out to sea.
Hurricane Claudette (2003), made landfall near Puerto Morelos, Quintana Roo, then later struck near Port O'Connor, Texas.
Tropical Storm Claudette (2009), made landfall on Santa Rosa Island, Florida.
Tropical Storm Claudette (2015), a short-lived tropical storm that formed off the coast of North Carolina and dissipated over the open Atlantic.
Tropical Storm Claudette (2021), a weak storm that caused heavy rain and tornadoes across the Southeastern United States.

In the south-west Indian Ocean:
Cyclone Claudette (1979), caused severe damage to Mauritius and Réunion.

Atlantic hurricane set index articles